is a Japanese motorcycle racer.

Career statistics

Grand Prix motorcycle racing career

By season

Races by year
(key) (Races in bold indicate pole position, races in italics indicate fastest lap)

References

External links

1980 births
Living people
Japanese motorcycle racers
125cc World Championship riders